Trento railway station is the main station of Trento, capital of the autonomous province of Trentino, in northeastern Italy.

The station was opened in 1859 by the Austrian Empire's Südbahn. It is located on the trans-Alpine Brenner Railway connecting Verona to Innsbruck. It is also a terminus of two branch lines: Valsugana Railway (to Levico Terme) and Trento-Malè metre-gauged railway.

The station is currently managed by Rete Ferroviaria Italiana (RFI). The commercial area of the passenger building, however, is managed by Centostazioni, whereas train services are operated by Trenitalia and ÖBB-DB.

Location
Trento railway station is situated at Piazza Dante, the northwestern edge of the city centre and on the east bank of River Adige (River Etsch).

Features

The passenger building hosts the ticket office, a waiting room, two newsagent stores and a cafe bar.

The station has four tracks and three through platforms. At the southern end, there is a bay platform for trains operating on the Valsugana Railway. The metre-gauged railway station of the same name is located at the northern end. In addition, there is a locomotive shed for siding train carriages overnight. The goods yard is situated at Roncaforte district, a short distance to the north of the station.

Train services
The station has five million passenger movements per year and is therefore the second busiest, after Bozen/Bolzano, within the region in terms of passenger numbers.

The following services call at the station:

Domestic

 High-speed Train (Trenitalia Frecciargento) Bolzano/Bozen-Naples: Bolzano/Bozen - Trento/Trient - Verona - Bologna - Florence - Rome - (Naples)
 Regional Train (Trenitalia Regional Express or Regional) Brennero/Brenner-Bologna: Brennero/Brenner - Fortezza/Franzensfeste - Bressanone/Brixen - Chuisa/Klausen - Bolzano/Bozen - Trento/Trient - Rovereto/Rofreit - Verona - Isola della Scala - Nogara - Bologna 
 Regional Train (Trenitalia Regional): Bolzano/Bozen - Ora/Auer - Trento/Trient - San Cristoforo al Lago-Ischia - Bassano del Grappa - (Castelfranco Veneto) - (Venice)
 Regional Train (Trenitalia Regional) Bolzano/Bozen-Ala/Ahl-am-Etsch: Bolzano/Bozen - Laives/Leifers - Ora/Aura - Egna/Neumarkt - Salorno/Salurn - Mezzocorona/Kronmetz - Trento/Trient - Rovereto/Rofreit - Mori - Ala/Ahl-am-Etsch
 Night Train (Trenitalia Intercity Notte) Bolzano/Bozen-Rome: Bolzano/Bozen - Trento/Trient - Rovereto/Rofreit - Verona - Bologna - Florence - Rome
 Metre-gauge Train (Trentino-Trasporti Val di Non Line) Trento/Trient-Malè: Trento/Trient - Mezzolombardo - Cles - Malè - Mezzana

Cross-border

(D for Germany, A for Austria)

 Intercity Train (ÖBB Eurocity) Munich-Verona/Venice: Munich(D) - Rosenheim (D) - Kufstein(A) - Wörgl (A) - Jenbach(A) - Innsbruck(A) - Bolzano/Bozen - Trento/Trient - Rovereto/Rofreit - Verona - (Padua) - (Venice)
 Intercity Train (ÖBB Eurocity) Munich-Verona/Bologna: Munich(D) - Rosenheim (D) - Kufstein(A) - Wörgl (A) - Jenbach(A) - Innsbruck(A) - Bolzano/Bozen - Trento/Trient - Rovereto/Rofreit - Verona - (Bologna)

See also

History of rail transport in Italy
List of railway stations in Trentino-Alto Adige/Südtirol
Rail transport in Italy
Railway stations in Italy

References

Notes

Further reading
 Paola Pettenella (ed), La stazione di Trento di Angiolo Mazzoni, "Quaderni di Architettura" n. 1, Electa, Milano, 1994

External links

Description and pictures of Trento railway station 

This article is based upon a translation of the Italian language version as at December 2010.

Buildings and structures in Trento
Railway stations in Trentino
Railway stations opened in 1859